Indian Script Code for Information Interchange (ISCII) is a coding scheme for representing various writing systems of India. It encodes the main Indic scripts and a Roman transliteration. The supported scripts are: Bengali–Assamese, Devanagari, Gujarati, Gurmukhi, Kannada, Malayalam, Oriya, Tamil, and Telugu. ISCII does not encode the writing systems of India that are based on Persian, but its writing system switching codes nonetheless provide for Kashmiri, Sindhi, Urdu, Persian, Pashto and Arabic. The Persian-based writing systems were subsequently encoded in the PASCII encoding.

ISCII has not been widely used outside certain government institutions, although a variant without the  mechanism was used on classic Mac OS, Mac OS Devanagari, and it has now been rendered largely obsolete by Unicode. Unicode uses a separate block for each Indic writing system, and largely preserves the ISCII layout within each block.

Background

The Brahmi-derived writing systems have similar structure. So ISCII encodes letters with the same phonetic value at the same code point, overlaying the various scripts. For example, the ISCII codes 0xB3 0xDB represent [ki]. This will be rendered as കി in Malayalam, कि in Devanagari, as ਕਿ in Gurmukhi, and as கி in Tamil. The writing system can be selected in rich text by markup or in plain text by means of the  code described below.

One motivation for the use of a single encoding is the idea that it will allow easy transliteration from one writing system to another. However, there are enough incompatibilities that this is not really a practical idea. 

ISCII is an 8-bit encoding. The lower 128 code points are plain ASCII, the upper 128 code points are ISCII-specific. In addition to the code points representing characters, ISCII makes use of a code point with mnemonic  that indicates that the following byte contains one of two kinds of information. One set of values changes the writing system until the next writing system indicator or end-of-line. Another set of values select display modes such as bold and italic. ISCII does not provide a means of indicating the default writing system.

Codepage layout 

The following table shows the character set for Devanagari. The code sets for Assamese, Bengali, Gujarati, Gurmukhi, Kannada, Malayalam, Oriya, Tamil, and Telugu are similar, with each Devanagari form replaced by the equivalent form in each writing system. Each character is shown with its decimal code and its Unicode equivalent.

Special code points 

 INV character—code point D9 (217) The INV (invisible consonant) character is used as a pseudo-consonant to display combining elements in isolation. For example, क (ka) + ् (halant) + INV = क्‍ (half ka). For this reason, Apple maps the ISCII INV character to the Unicode , so as to guarantee round-tripping.
 ATR character—code point EF (239)  The ATR (attribute) character followed by a byte code is used to switch to a different font attribute (such as bold) or to a different ISCII or PASCII language (such as Bengali), up to the next ATR sequence or the end of the line.  This has no direct Unicode equivalent, as font attributes are not part of Unicode, and each script has a distinct set of code points.

 EXT character—code point F0 (240)  The EXT (extensions for Vedic) character followed by a byte code indicates a Vedic accent.  This has no direct Unicode equivalent, as Vedic accents are assigned to distinct code points.
 Halant character ्—code point E8 (232)  The halant character removes the implicit vowel from a consonant and is used between consonants to represent conjunct consonants.  For example, क (ka) + ् (halant) + त (ta) = क्त (kta).  The sequence ् (halant) + ् (halant) displays a conjunct with an explicit halant, for example क (ka) + ् (halant) + ् (halant) + त (ta) = क्‌त.  The sequence ् (halant) + ़ (nukta) displays a conjunct with half consonants, if available, for example क (ka) + ् (halant) + ़ (nukta) + त (ta) = क्‍त.

 Nukta character ़—code point E9 (233) The nukta character after another ISCII character is used for a number of rarer characters which don't exist in the main ISCII set.  For example क (ka) + ़ (nukta) = क़ (qa). These characters have precomposed forms in Unicode, as shown in the following table.

Code pages for ISCII conversion

To convert from Unicode (UTF-8) to an ISCII / ANSI coding, the following code pages may be used:

 57002: Devanagari (Hindi, Marathi, Sanskrit, Konkani)
 57003: Bengali
 57004: Tamil
 57005: Telugu
 57006: Assamese 
 57007: Odia
 57008: Kannada
 57009: Malayalam
 57010: Gujarati
 57011: Punjabi (Gurmukhi)

Code points for all languages

References

External links 
 Converters from/to ISCII to/from various fonts
 The ISCII 1991 standard (PDF)
 Padma – Mozilla extension for transforming ISCII to Unicode 
 Padma – Transformer from ISCII to Unicode for Telugu
 PHP script for ISCII to and from Unicode

Indic computing
Character sets
Hindustani orthography